The 2007–08 Toto Cup Al was the 24th season of the third most important football tournament in Israel since its introduction and the third edition involving Premier League clubs only. 

The final, played at Ramat Gan Stadium on 19 December 2007, was won by Maccabi Haifa, who had beaten Bnei Sakhnin 2–0 in the final.

Format change
The 12 Premier League clubs were divided to three groups, with four teams in each group, playing a double round-robin tournament. The top two teams and the two best third-place finishers from the three groups advanced to the quarter-finals.

Group stage
The matches were played from 4 August 2007 to 14 November 2007

Group A

Group B

Group C

Knockout rounds

Quarter-finals

Semifinals

Final

See also
 Toto Cup
 2007–08 Israeli Premier League
 2007–08 Toto Cup Leumit

References

External links
 Toto Cup Al IFA 

Al
Toto Cup Al
Israel Toto Cup Al